Anita Astorino Kulik (born May 5, 1964) is an American politician who has served in the Pennsylvania House of Representatives from the 45th district since 2017. Kulik attended Bishop Canevin High School.

Committee assignments 

 Game & Fisheries
 Liquor Control
 Professional Licensure
 Veterans Affairs & Emergency Preparedness

References

1964 births
Living people
Democratic Party members of the Pennsylvania House of Representatives
People from Carnegie, Pennsylvania
21st-century American politicians